Tereza Kostková (born 14 June 1976) is a Czech actress and television presenter, daughter of actors Petr Kostka and Carmen Mayerová.

Biography

Career
After graduating from high school, Kostková studied at the VOŠ herecká acting college, where she earned an associate degree, after which she began working in theatre.

Between 1997 and 1999, she worked at the Západočeské divadlo in Cheb and between 1999 and 2014, she was based at the Divadlo pod Palmovkou in Prague. She has been active in a number of other theatres, including Broadway Theatre (Prague).

Since 2006, she has co-hosted the television show StarDance with Marek Eben. In 2009, she co-hosted Duety… když hvězdy zpívají with Aleš Háma.

Kostková has appeared in numerous television shows, including Bazén, Proč bychom se netopili, Pojišťovna štěstí, Ordinace v růžové zahradě 2, Obchoďák, Cesty domů, Vinaři, and Temný Kraj. Her film roles include Líbáš jako ďábel (2012) and Women on the Run (2019).

Personal life
Kostková is distantly related to actor Rudolf Hrušínský, on her father's side.

Between 2006 and 2015, she was married to theatre director and manager Petr Kracik, with whom she has a son, Antonín. Since 2018, she has been married to Jakub Nvota.

Selected filmography

Film

References

External links

 
 
 Biography on csfd.cz
 Instagram profile

1976 births
Living people
Czech film actresses
21st-century Czech actresses
Czech stage actresses
Czech television actresses
Actresses from Prague
20th-century Czech actresses